The Men's 800 metre freestyle competition at the 2017 World Championships was held on 25 and 26 July 2017.

Records
Prior to the competition, the existing world and championship records were as follows.

Results

Heats
The heats were held on 25 July at 10:31.

Final
The final was held on 26 July at 19:05.

References

Men's 800 metre freestyle